Geraldine is a 1953 American comedy film directed by R. G. Springsteen and written by Frank Gill Jr. and Peter Milne. The film stars John Carroll, Mala Powers, Jim Backus, Stan Freberg, Kristine Miller and Leon Belasco. The film was released on December 16, 1953 by Republic Pictures.

Plot

Cast      
John Carroll as Grant Sanborn
Mala Powers as Janey Edwards
Jim Backus as Jason Ambrose
Stan Freberg as Billy Weber
Kristine Miller as Ellen Blake
Leon Belasco as Professor Dubois
Ludwig Stössel as Professor Berger
Earl Lee as Professor Palmer
Alan Reed as Frederick Sterling
Nana Bryant as Dean Blake
Carolyn Jones as Kitty

References

External links
 

1953 films
American comedy films
1953 comedy films
Republic Pictures films
Films directed by R. G. Springsteen
American black-and-white films
1950s English-language films
1950s American films